Edward LeRoy Rice  (August 24, 1871 - December 1, 1938) was an American producer of minstrel shows. He was the leading authority on the history of minstrel shows. He also bought and sold theatrical memorabilia.

Biography
He was born in Manhattan, New York City on August 24, 1871 as the second son of William Henry Rice (1844-1907), a minstrel performer.  He first performed on stage in Morristown, New Jersey on July 18, 1890.

He married Emma Rodenberger in Brooklyn, New York City on November 30, 1899. Starting in 1907 he wrote a column called "Man in the Bleachers" which ran in the New York Evening World for five weeks.

He was the author of Monarchs of Minstrelsy in 1911. He wrote a syndicated column for Press Publishing called "Anecdotes of Old-Time Actors, by 1913.

He died on December 1, 1938 in Manhattan, New York City. He was buried at Calvary Cemetery in Woodside, New York. His archive is housed at Princeton University.

Quote
"Let me begin by saying that I am not a "Monarch of Minstrelsy," not even ... I can remember, as a youngster even before my school days began, my father asking me if I wanted to be a minstrel."

External links
Edward Le Roy Rice performers at the Whitehouse at Getty Images

References

1871 births
1938 deaths
Burials at Calvary Cemetery (Queens)
Blackface minstrel managers and producers
Blackface minstrel performers